Taner Ölmez (born 9 August 1986) is a Turkish actor. He was the lead singer of the barabar group. His brother Taylan Özgür Ölmez is a musician. He is Alevi from Tunceli. He married Ece Çeşmioğlu in June 2021.

He started his acting career in 2009. His first popular drama was Kayıp Şehir where he acted as Sadık. He gained fame through Medcezir in which he played Mert Asım Serez. With Medcezir's co-star Hazar Ergüçlü, he played in surreal comedy series "Dudullu Postası" and fantasy series "Hakan: Muhafız". He is also known for portraying Ali Vefa in medical series Mucize Doktor.  With his wife Ece Çeşmioğlu, he played in Muhteşem Yüzyıl: Kösem and "Yüz Yüze". His detective dramas are "Alef" and "Çıplak Gerçek".

Filmography

Discography

References

1986 births
Living people
21st-century Turkish male actors
Turkish male film actors
Turkish male television actors
Golden Butterfly Award winners
People from Tunceli
Turkish Alevis